NGC 1971 (also known as ESO 56-SC128) is an open cluster which is in the Dorado constellation and is part of the Large Magellanic Cloud. It was discovered by John Herschel on December 23, 1834. Its apparent size is 11.9 by 0.80 arc minutes.

References

Open clusters
ESO objects
1971
Dorado (constellation)
Large Magellanic Cloud
Astronomical objects discovered in 1834
Discoveries by John Herschel